The Widukind-Gymnasium Enger (vidʊkɪnd-gYmnaʰsium əŋər) is a Gymnasium located on Tiefenbruchstraße 22, Enger, Herford, Northrhine-Westphalia. It is named after the Saxon leader Widukind, who is also buried in Enger. There are over one and a half thousand enrolled students and more than 100 teachers in the school.

Campus

School grounds
The WGE campus is kept as natural as possible. The Schulgarten for example is a big lawn surrounded by many green trees. There are also three soccer fields in the Schulgarten, and the members of the Neigungsfach Gartenarbeit are keeping plants on a garden with greenhouses for their studies. On the right of the soccer fields (as seen from the building) goes a long grassy path beside a field, with a wooden table at the other end. There is also a long connection of paths in the woods around the soccer fields.

At the main entrance is a big outdoor place (called the Schulhof) where many students hang out in the breaks. In the building near the main entrance is the mensa and the Mediothek. The secretariat and teacher's room are also near the main entrance. On the far side of the entrance are the two gyms. The bigger gym can be divided in 1:2 and holds a soccer field and a basketball court.

Buildings
The gymnasium's main building is largely composed of the Altbau, built in the 1970s. Then there is the Neubau, which is much smaller, at the end of the building. It was built in the 2000s. The Unterstufe (Grades 5-7) are studying in the Neubau.

Projects
This is a list of the WGE's projects:

•Ägypten-Projekt (Egypt Project)

The sixth graders tour to Hanover for two days and visit an Egyptian museum where they collect information. This will have a huge effect if they will do it in the Gymnasiums 7th grade or have to move to a Realschule.

•Sport-teams

The school also has its own teams for soccer, table tennis, badminton, etc.

•Internet-soap opera: Voll krass - das Leben (So Cool - Life)

•Rumpelstilzchen Literaturprojekt (Rumpelstiltskin Literature Competition)

•Choir, Orchester, and Jazz-Rock band

Schoolday

Start of the day
The schoolday at the WGE starts at 7:55 a.m., but the students can already entry their classrooms ten minutes earlier. There are school buses that deliver the students to the school until 7:50. This school buses are operated by bus companies like Kuhlmann and the Stadtbus of Enger.

Then the first hour (45 min.) starts. At 8:40, with the end of the first hour, a five-minute break begins, in which the students stay in the classrooms. After the short break another single hour starts, either another subject then the first one or a continuation of it.

Afterwards, a twenty-minute break begins, in which the students must go outdoor. In this break the students play soccer, table tennis, or basketball. Some also eat some brought food or buy something (bratwurst, pretzel, pizza, etc.) at the kiosk.

This is followed by a Doppelstunde (German for "Double hour"), a  twenty-minute break and a following Doppelstunde again.

Noon break
Since 2009, the WGE extended the classes on  Monday, Wednesday, md Thursday until 15:30. The other two days end at 13:10.

On the three days until 15:30, the students have a noon break from 13:10 to 14:00. The students may stay in the building, but can also go outside to play or do anything. However, they are not allowed to leave the school campus. An exception of this rule are the students of the Oberstufe (grades 10+).

The mensa is also opened for getting and eating the ordered meals in the time period 13:10 to 13:45.

Afternoon class
On the days Monday, Wednesday, Thursday, the schoolday is extended until 17:35. There are no breaks between this two school hours.

Neigungsfach and Profilfach
The Neigungsfach/Profilfach is a subject of choice which is performed on the Wednesday afternoon class (13:50-15:30). These subjects are:

•Neigungsfächer (classes 5-7)
Tennis
Historic fighting
Swimming
Art
Walking
Modeling
Theatre
Chess
Dancing
Versuchskaninchen 5
Versuchskaninchen 6
Handball
Choir
Sport
Gardening
Sculpturing
Sewing
History
Building marionettes
Speedstacking
Writing
Instrument-blowing

•Profilfächer (classes 8-9)
Theater
Spanish
Latin
Philosophy
Camera
Football
Biotechnology
English
Volleyball
Cooking
Writing
Pedagogy

Extended afternoon class
The Oberstufe (classes 10-12) has also sometimes classes until 17:05, with a short break from 15:30 to 15:35.

Notable alumni
Susanne Ihsen, professor at the Technical University of Munich
Markus Rathey, professor at the Yale University
Karl-Heinz Wiesemann, Bishop of Speyer, Germany
Frank Sorgatz and Bernd Gössling, members of Forever Young)
Marcel Stadel, player of TuS Dassendorf)
Frederik Gößling, trainer of SpVgg Greuther Fürth

References

Gymnasiums in Germany